Adil Murad is a Pakistani film producer and actor in films, television serials and tele-films, and son of actor Waheed Murad.

Early life 
Adil's grandfather, Nisar Murad, was a noted film distributor who belonged to Sialkot in Punjab. The Murads claimed Turkish ancestry; one of their ancestors, Murat, was a soldier of Ottoman-origin serving in the Mughal army who settled in Punjab.

Career 
He was introduced in the Pakistani Urdu colour film Raja Sahib in 1996, but the film, due to bad direction and a weak story, flopped at the box office but his performance was very well received and praised. Since then, he has been working in tele-films as an actor and as producer. Later he was cast by Shoaib Mansoor in his tele-film Streets of Karachi, which was based on the life of a couple in Karachi and the ups and downs of the city. In 2016 ARY Film Awards gave Special Recognition Award to his father Waheed Murad for his inspirational work in film industry which was received by him.

Personal life 
Adil married tennis player Marrium Raheem and has two children.

Filmography

Television series

Telefilm

Film

Host

References

External links 
 

1976 births
20th-century Pakistani male actors
Pakistani male film actors
Living people
Pakistani male television actors
Pakistani people of Turkish descent
21st-century Pakistani male actors
Punjabi people
Male actors in Urdu cinema
Pakistani television directors
Waheed Murad
Pakistani television producers
Pakistani television hosts